This is a list of electoral results for the East Yarra Province in Victorian state elections.

Members for East Yarra Province

Election results

Elections in the 2000s

This election followed the vacancy caused by the resignation of Mark Birrell, who resigned. The by-election was conducted on the same day as the 2002 election, but used the old electoral boundaries.

Elections in the 1990s

Elections in the 1980s

 This by-election was caused by the resignation of Bill Campbell. Two party preferred result was estimated.

 Two party preferred vote was estimated.

Elections in the 1970s

 Preferences were not distributed.

 Two party preferred vote was estimated.

 This by-election was caused by the resignation of Rupert Hamer, who successfully contested the 1971 Kew state by-election to move to the Lower House upon being elected as leader of the Liberal party. The two party preferred margin was estimated.

 Two party preferred vote was estimated.

Elections in the 1960s

 Two party preferred vote was estimated.

 This by-election was caused by the death of Ewen Cameron. Preferences were not distributed.

 Two party preferred vote was estimated.

Elections in the 1950s

References

Victoria (Australia) state electoral results by district